Whitfield House is located on Fiennes Street in Toodyay, Western Australia.

History
The house was completed in 1863 for John Acton Wroth. It was originally a four roomed cottage with shingle roof. From 1871, Mrs. G. Whitfield used the site for a private school. In 1887, Augustus Frederick Lee Steere of the Lee Steere family purchased the house and added two rooms on the east end. He bequeathed the place to the Anglican Church on his death in 1903. The first clergyman to occupy the rectory was the Reverend John Ellis. It later became a private residence.

The house remains today as an extended dwelling of brick and iron construction with rendered arches to door and window openings, brick chimneys and casement windows. The front verandah has timber posts and colonial style cross-cross balustrading.

A commemorative plaque on the building notes that it was renovated in 1949, through the generosity of Sir Ernest and Lady Lee Steere.

References

Buildings and structures in Toodyay, Western Australia
Anglican Church of Australia
Fiennes Street, Toodyay